New Hadley Halt was a minor station between Oakengates and Wellington on the former Great Western Railway's London Paddington to Birkenhead via Birmingham Snow Hill line. It was opened by the Great Western Railway in 1934. It was closed on 13 May 1985  due to uneconomic required repairs and it was demolished in 1986.

References

Further reading

Disused railway stations in Shropshire
Telford
Former Great Western Railway stations
Railway stations in Great Britain opened in 1934
Railway stations in Great Britain closed in 1985